Georgi Petrov Georgiev (born 3 August 1985 in Kazanlak) is a Bulgarian former cyclist, who competed professionally between 2004 and 2016 for the Koloezdachen Klub Nesebar, Brisaspor,  and  squads.

Major results

2005
 1st Stage 6 Tour of Romania
2006
 2nd Road race, National Road Championships
2008
 1st  Road race, National Road Championships
 3rd Tour of Vojvodina II
 5th Overall Tour of Szeklerland
2010
 1st Stage 2 Tour of Bulgaria
 1st Stage 6 Tour du Maroc
 3rd Overall Tour of Alanya
1st Stage 2
 3rd Overall Tour of Trakya
 5th Overall Tour of Marmara
 9th Overall Tour of Victory
1st Stage 4
2011
 4th Overall Tour of Romania
 9th Overall Tour of Szeklerland
2012
 2nd Road race, National Road Championships
 3rd Overall Tour of Bulgaria
 7th Overall Tour of Szeklerland
2013
 1st Overall Tour of Szeklerland
1st Stage 2
 2nd Road race, National Road Championships
 6th Overall Tour of Bulgaria
1st Stage 3
2014
 2nd Road race, National Road Championships
 2nd Overall Tour of Szeklerland
 4th Overall Tour du Maroc
 Challenge du Prince
6th Trophée de la Maison Royale
9th Trophée de l'Anniversaire
 8th Overall Tour de Serbie
1st Stage 3
 8th Overall Tour of Fuzhou
2015
 4th Overall Tour of Szeklerland
 4th Overall Tour of Bulgaria
 6th Overall Tour of Black Sea
 7th Overall Tour of Ankara
 9th Overall Tour de Serbie
2016
 1st  Road race, National Road Championships
 1st Stage 2 Tour de Serbie
 2nd Overall Tour of Ankara
1st Mountains classification
 10th Overall Tour of Mersin

References

External links

Profile at Radsportseiten.net

1985 births
Living people
Bulgarian male cyclists
People from Kazanlak